The China-Japan Supermatches (日中スーパー囲碁) was a Go competition.

Outline
The China-Japan Supermatches were a series of team competition between China and Japan in the board game of Go. The tournament was hosted by NEC; it was held 16 times from 1984 to 2001. The matches were in the knock-out format with 6 to 9 players on each side for the first 11 times (1984-1996). In the later games, each side had 3 players for one-on-one matches.

Before the late 1980s top Japanese players were generally considered to be at a higher level than the rest of the world, but in the end, China won 9 times in total. The result has had a great impact on the development of the game in China afterward.

Winners

References

International Go competitions
1984 in go
Recurring sporting events established in 1984
Recurring sporting events disestablished in 2001